Nikolay Vasilyevich Bogdanovsky (born on 17 January 1957) is a Russian army officer. He has been the First Deputy Chief of the General Staff of the Armed Forces of the Russian Federation since 12 June 2014. He commanded the Central Military District from 2012 to 2014.

Biography

Nikolay Bogdanovsky was born on 17 January 1957.

He graduated from the Yekaterinburg Suvorov Military School between 1972 and 1974, and the Moscow Higher Military Command School named after the Supreme Soviet of the RSFSR between 1974 and 1978.

Bogdanovsky joined the Soviet Army in 1978, and served as a reconnaissance platoon commander, company commander, chief of staff of a motorized rifle battalion, commander of a motorized rifle (tank) battalion in the Southern Group of Forces in Hungary between 1978 and 1984.

He also graduated from the Frunze Military Academy between 1984 and 1987. 

Between 1987 and 1994, he was the chief of staff of a fortified area (UR), commander of a motorized rifle regiment, chief of staff of a motorized rifle division.

He also graduated from the Military Academy of the General Staff of the Armed Forces between 1994 and 1996.

Between 1996 and 2006, Bogdanovsky was the Chief of the 392nd Pacific Center for Training Junior Specialists of Motorized Rifle Forces, and the Chief of Staff and Commander of the 35th Army. On 12 December 2004 he was awarded the rank of Lieutenant General.

From June 2006 to January 2008, Bogdanovsky was the Deputy Commander of the Far Eastern Military District. 

Form January 2008 to March 2009, he was the Chief of the General Staff of the Ground Forces, the 1st Deputy Commander-in-Chief of the Ground Forces.

From 24 March 2009 to 9 January 2011, Bogdanovsky became the Commander of the Leningrad Military District. By the decree of the President of the Russia on 9 January 2011, he was appointed Deputy Commander-in-Chief of the Ground Forces for combat training.

On 13 December 2012 he was awarded the rank of Colonel General.

From 24 December 2012 to 12 June 2014, Bogdanovsky became the commander of the Central Military District.

By the Decree of the President of the Russia of 12 June 2014, he was appointed First Deputy Chief of the General Staff of the Armed Forces of Russia.

In connection with the events in Ukraine, between August and September 2014, Bogdanovsky was included in the sanctions list initiated by Canada

He took part in negotiations on coordination of actions with the Israel Defense Forces between 29 September and 1 October 2015 during the Russian military intervention in Syria.

References

1957 births
Living people
Russian colonel generals
People from Altai Krai
Recipients of the Order of Courage
Recipients of the Order of Military Merit (Russia)
Frunze Military Academy alumni
Military Academy of the General Staff of the Armed Forces of Russia alumni